Fabricio Domínguez Huertas (born 24 June 1998) is a Uruguayan professional footballer who plays as an attacking midfielder for Defensa y Justicia, on loan from Racing Club.

Career
Born in Montevideo, Domínguez moved to Argentina with Racing Club in 2017; amid Independiente interest. He made the substitutes' bench in September 2018 for a Primera División win over Unión Santa Fe. In August 2019, Domínguez was loaned to Primera B Nacional with Tigre. His senior debut arrived on 18 August in a home defeat to Quilmes, which preceded eleven further appearances; including two in the Copa Libertadores against Palmeiras and Bolívar. His loan was cut short due to the COVID-19 pandemic. In the succeeding November, Domínguez made his competitive Racing debut versus Atlético Tucumán.

On 7 July 2022, Domínguez was loaned out from Racing Club, to fellow league club Defensa y Justicia until the end of 2023 with a purchase option.

Career statistics
.

Notes

References

External links

1998 births
Living people
Footballers from Montevideo
Uruguayan footballers
Association football midfielders
Primera Nacional players
Racing Club de Avellaneda footballers
Club Atlético Tigre footballers
Defensa y Justicia footballers